Vincenzo Fresia (2 October 1888 – 1946) was an Italian footballer and manager who played as a forward and made one appearance for the Italy national team.

Career
Fresia played the majority of his club career at Pro Vercelli, except for a brief spell at Torino in which he made one appearance. He made his only international appearance for Italy on 15 June 1913 in a friendly match against Austria. The match, which was played in Vienna, finished as a 0–2 loss for Italy.

Following his playing career, Fresia began his career as a manager. He coached Ravenna, Prato, Grosseto, Carrarese and Molfetta Sportiva.

Career statistics

International

References

External links
 
 

1888 births
1946 deaths
People from Vercelli
Italian footballers
Italy international footballers
Association football forwards
F.C. Pro Vercelli 1892 players
Torino F.C. players
Italian football managers
Ravenna F.C. managers
F.C. Grosseto S.S.D. managers
Carrarese Calcio managers
Footballers from Piedmont
Sportspeople from the Province of Vercelli